The 1899 Montana Agricultural football team was an American football team that represented the Agricultural College of the State of Montana (later renamed Montana State University) during the 1899 college football season. In its first and only season under head coach W. J. Adams, the team compiled a 3–0 record and did not allow opponents to score a point, scoring 54 points to 0 for the opposition. After three  prior losses to the University of Montana, the 1899 team won the program's first victories in the Montana–Montana State football rivalry that has since been played more than 100 times.

Schedule

References

Montana Agricultural
Montana State Bobcats football seasons
College football undefeated seasons
Montana Agricultural football